Vitas Gerulaitis and Sandy Mayer were the defending champions, but lost in the quarterfinals to Ross Case and Geoff Masters.

Brian Gottfried and Raúl Ramírez defeated Case and Masters in the final, 3–6, 6–3, 8–6, 2–6, 7–5 to win the gentlemen's doubles title at the 1976 Wimbledon Championships. This was Gottfried and Ramírez' first and only Wimbledon title, and second Grand Slam overall.

Seeds

  Brian Gottfried /  Raúl Ramírez (champions)
  Jimmy Connors /  Ilie Năstase (second round)
  Bob Hewitt /  Frew McMillan (first round)
  Tom Okker /  Marty Riessen (second round)
  Bob Lutz /  Stan Smith  (semifinals)
  Vitas Gerulaitis /  Sandy Mayer (quarterfinals)
  Wojciech Fibak /  Karl Meiler (quarterfinals)
  Fred McNair /  Sherwood Stewart (first round)

Draw

Finals

Top half

Section 1

Section 2

Bottom half

Section 3

Section 4

References

External links

1976 Wimbledon Championships – Men's draws and results at the International Tennis Federation

Men's Doubles
Wimbledon Championship by year – Men's doubles